Centaurus is a mission concept to flyby the centaurs 2060 Chiron and Schwassmann-Wachmann 1. It was submitted in response to the NASA Discovery program call for proposals in 2019 but ultimately was not among the four missions selected for further development by NASA in February 2020. If it had been selected, Centaurus would have been the first mission to attempt a flyby of a centaur.

Overview

If selected, Centaurus would have been capable of launching in any year between 2026 and 2029. The primary targets of the Centaurus mission were the centaurs 2060 Chiron and 29P/Schwassmann–Wachmann (often shortened to "SW1"). Centaurs are "escapees" from the Kuiper belt with giant planet-crossing orbits. Both objects are active centaurs with perihelia within the orbit of Saturn. The Centaurus payload included imagers and spectrometers to study the surfaces, comae, and any potential rings and shepherd moons around these objects. Use of solar panels would have eliminated the need for radioisotope thermoelectric generators (RTGs) or other nuclear sources.

Both mission targets show evidence for rings and/or cometary activity. Chiron is the second largest known centaur, by diameter, after 10199 Chariklo. Activity was identified in the past and it may have rings. SW1 is the most active centaur known, averaging over 7 periods of activity each year. This equates to an outburst of cometary activity approximately every 50 days. Thus, there was a high likelihood of Centaurus flying by SW1 during a period of activity.

Mission leadership 
Centaurus is a joint proposal of the Southwest Research Institute (SwRI) and the Jet Propulsion Laboratory (JPL). The Johns Hopkins University Applied Physics Laboartory (APL) and NASA Goddard Spaceflight Center are also involved. The principal investigator (PI) of the Centaurus mission is Alan Stern of SwRI in Boulder, Colorado. The Deputy PI is Kelsi Singer of SwRI.

See also
List of missions to minor planets
List of Solar System probes

References

External links
 Poster associated with the Singer et al. (2019) EPSC/DPS abstract

Discovery program proposals
Proposed NASA space probes
Missions to minor planets